Rushbearing is an old English ecclesiastical festival in which rushes are collected and carried to be strewn on the floor of the parish church. The tradition dates back to the time when most buildings had earthen floors and rushes were used as a form of renewable floor covering for cleanliness and insulation. The festival was widespread in Britain from the Middle Ages and well established by the time of Shakespeare, but had fallen into decline by the beginning of the 19th century, as church floors were flagged with stone. The custom was revived later in the 19th century and is kept alive today as an annual event in a number of towns and villages in the north of England.

History 
In 601 AD Pope Gregory I wrote a letter to Mellitus (a member of the Gregorian mission sent to England to convert the Anglo-Saxons from their native paganism to Christianity) which read:
When, therefore, Almighty God shall bring you to the most reverend man our brother bishop, St Augustine, tell him what I have, upon mature deliberation on the affair of the English, thought of; namely, that the temples of the idols in that nation ought not to be destroyed. Let holy water be made, and sprinkled in the said temples; let altars be erected, and let relics be deposited in them. For since those temples are built, it is requisite that they be converted from the worship of the devils to the service of the true God; that the nation, not seeing those temples destroyed, may remove error from their hearts, and knowing and adoring the true God, may the more familiarly resort to the same places to which they have been accustomed. And because they are wont to sacrifice many oxen in honour of the devils, let them celebrate a religious and solemn festival, not slaughtering the beasts for devils, but to be consumed by themselves, to the praise of God...

Every church at its consecration was given the name of a patron saint and either the day of its consecration or the saint's feast day became the church's festival. Church services began at sunset on Saturday and the night of prayer was called a vigil, eve or, due to the late hour, wake - from the Old English  waecan. Each village had a wake with quasi-religious celebrations followed by church services then sports, games, dancing and drinking.

During the Middle Ages the floors of most churches and dwellings consisted of compacted earth, and rushes (commonly "sweet flag" Acorus calamus) or other herbs and grasses were strewn over them to provide a sweet smelling, renewable covering for insulation. The Household roll of Edward II (1307–1327) shows a payment to a John de Carlford for "a supply of rushes for strewing the Kings chamber". In the Churchwardens' accounts for St Mary-at-Hill, London, payments of 3d for rushes are shown for 1493 and 1504, and in the parish register of the church at Kirkham, Lancashire, disbursements for rushes are found in 1604 and 1631 for 9s 6d, but not after 1634 when the church floor was flagged. At Saddleworth (then in Yorkshire) the church floor was covered with rushes until 1826.

The churches allocated a particular day in the calendar for the rushbearing and, by the 16th century, it was customary to ring the church bells and provide wine, ale and cakes for the rushbearers. Some festivals were more elaborate with mimetic and representational elements. An account from Cawthorne in Yorkshire from 1596 said that the people "did arm and disguyse themselves some of them putting on womens aparrell, other some of them putting on longe haire & visardes, and others arminge them with the furnyture of souldiers, and being there thus armed and disguysed did that day goe from the Churche, and so went up and downe the towne showinge themselves".

The festival often attracted unsavoury characters, such as pedlars, cutpurses and pickpockets, and became a pretext for heavy drinking in otherwise quiet communities, such that even pillars of the community would occasionally disgrace themselves:
Tristram Tyldedesly, the minister at Rufford and Marsden on Sundays and hollidaies hath danced emongst light and youthful companie both men and women at weddings, drynkings and rishbearings; and in his dancing and after wantonlye and dissolutely he kissed a mayd...whereat divers persons were offended and so sore grieved that there was weapons drawn and great dissenssion arose.
Puritan magistrates and ministers opposed Sunday rushbearing, probably because of the intemperance and indecorum which attended the occasion. Consequently, when James I issued the Declaration of Sports in 1617, which listed the forms of recreation permitted on Sundays and Holy days, rushbearing was listed, along with other pursuits, such as archery, Whitsun Ales, Morris dancing and the setting up of Maypoles. Indeed, when James I visited Sir Richard Hoghton in Lancashire in 1617, the first entertainment offered was a rushbearing.

In the 18th century the ceremony usually formed part of the annual feast or wake, held on the Sunday closest to the feast day of the saint to which the church was dedicated. The rushes were brought to the church in a procession, accompanied by music and Morris dancing. In some areas the rushes were carried in individual bundles and in others on a rushcart.  Where a rushcart was used it became the main focus and was decorated with garlands and flowers, tinsel, and 'all the silver plate that can be borrowed in the neighbourhood'. When the procession reached the parish church the rushes were strewn on the floor and the garlands used to adorn the church.  It is not known how long rushcarts have been a feature of the festivities, but an account by the Hon. H. Egerton from 1726 implies that the one he saw in use in Prestwich was of long standing.

By the early 19th century the tradition had died out in many parts of the country but it evolved and survived in industrial parts of Lancashire.

The History of the county of Derby (1829) gives descriptions of the rushbearings at Chapel-en-le-Frith: 

At Whitwell, instead of rushes, the hay of a piece of grass-land called the church close, is annually, on Midsummer eve, carted and spread in the church.
and Glossop:
Previously to our leaving Glossop we visited the village church...Here we observed the remains of some garlands hung up near to the entrance into the chancel.  They were mementos of a custom of a rather singular nature, that lingers about this part of  Derbyshire, after having been lost in nearly every other. It is denominated rush-bearing; and the ceremonies of this truly rural fête take place annually, on one of the days appropriated to the wake or village festival. A car or wagon is on this occasion decorated with rushes. A pyramid of rushes, ornamented with wreaths of flowers, and surmounted with a garland, occupies the centre of the car, which is usually bestrewed with the choicest flowers that the meadows of Glossop Dale can produce, and liberally furnished with flags and streamers. Thus prepared, it is drawn through the different parts of the village, preceded by groups of dancers and a band of music. All the ribands in the place may be said to be in requisition on this festive day, and he who is the greatest favourite amongst the lasses is generally the gayest personage in the cavalcade. After parading the village, the car stops at the church gates, where it is dismantled of its honours. The rushes and flowers are then taken into the church and strewed amongst the pews and along the floors, and the garlands are hung up near the entrance into the chancel, in remembrance of the day. The ceremony being ended, the various parties who made up the procession retire, amidst music and dancing, to the village inn, where they spend the remainder of the day in joyous festivity.

At this time there were some attempts to revive the custom, as it appealed to the Romanticism of the period. In Cumbria, the ceremony was revived in Warcop and Musgrave at the wish of the Rev. Septimus Collinson, Provost of Queen's College, Oxford and a native of the village, after being extinct for about thirty years, but an attempt to revive it at Great Langdale proved unsuccessful. At Grasmere the rushbearing took a different form. In Clarke's Survey of the Lakes (1770) the bearers were said to be women and girls but by 1887, when the romantic poet William Wordsworth became involved, the rushbearings were described as "tall poles decked with rushes and flowers" carried by boys and girls up to the age of fifteen. 
Rural Ceremony
Closing the sacred Book which long has fed
Our meditations, give we to a day
Of annual joy one tributary lay;
This day, when, forth by rustic music led,
The village Children, while the sky is red
With evening lights, advance in long array
Through the still churchyard, each with garland gay,
That, carried sceptre-like, o'ertops the head
Of the proud Bearer. To the wide church-door,
Charged with these offerings which their fathers bore       
For decoration in the Papal time,
The innocent procession softly moves:--
The spirit of Laud is pleased in heaven's pure clime,
And Hooker's voice the spectacle approves!  – William Wordsworth

In many places there was much competition between towns and villages to provide the best decked rushcarts and in the early 19th century it was said that the Lancashire town of Rochdale could assemble at least eight, and sometimes a dozen rushcarts from the surrounding villages for the festival.

...The green rush, the green rush, we bear it along,
To the church of our village with triumph and song,
We strew the cold chancel and kneel on it there,
While its fresh odours rise with our voices in prayer.
Hark the peal from the old tower in praise of it rings,
Let us seek the green rush by the green woodland springs. - Letitia Elizabeth Landon (1802-1838) The rush-bearing here is at Ambleside and the accompanying painting is by Thomas Allom.

Rushbearing today 
Rushbearing ceremonies have survived, or been revived, in a number of towns and villages in northwest England including: Lymm and Forest Chapel in Cheshire, Gorton, Littleborough, and Saddleworth in Greater Manchester, Newchurch in Pendle in Lancashire, Sowerby Bridge in Yorkshire, and Ambleside, Great Musgrave, Grasmere, Urswick and Warcop in Cumbria.

Rushbearing is also found in some parishes in North-East Wales such as Holt and Isycoed on the west side of the River Dee.

Rush Sunday is one of the highlights of Bristol's civic calendar, upholding a tradition which goes back over 500 years.

William Canynges of Redcliffe Street - merchant, five-times Mayor of Bristol, its MP and a principal benefactor of St Mary Redcliffe - was ordained priest after the death of his wife in 1467 and first celebrated Mass in the church on Whitsunday the following year.

To commemorate this, William Spenser, also sometime Mayor of Bristol, made provision in 1493 for three sermons to be preached before the Mayor and commonalty on the days after Whitsun; a change to one sermon on Whitsunday was made at the time of the Reformation.

Those attending carried nosegays and the floor of the church was strewn with rushes, traditions that are maintained to this day in the service held annually ever since and attended by the Lord Mayor, Aldermen and Councillors of the City in their traditional robes and regalia.

https://www.stmaryredcliffe.co.uk/rush-sunday

References 

Bibliography

English folklore
Culture in Greater Manchester